Beni Snous is a Berber variety close to Zenati languages spoken near Tlemcen in Algeria.

In the early 20th century, Beni Snous Berber was spoken in the villages of Kef, Tghalimet, Bou Hallou, Ait Larbi, Ait Achir, Adziddaz, and Mazzer; all speakers were bilingual in the Arabic language.  The Beni Snous had no trouble conversing with their Berber-speaking neighbours among the Beni Bou Said just to the west, and (with some difficulty) could communicate in Berber with people from Figuig, Beni Iznacen, beside the border in Morocco.  However, they found Tashelhiyt (in southern Morocco) and Kabyle (in central Algeria) almost unintelligible.

Today, only a few elderly people in the region still speak Berber. Most of the Beni Snous have shifted to Arabic, retaining only a few words from their ancestral language, such as tabɣa "blackberries" or azduz "pestle".

See also
Languages of Algeria

Bibliography

References

External links
 Extinction de tamazight à Béni snous - the interviewer (speaking in Arabic) elicits Berber vocabulary from some of the last elderly speakers of Beni Snous Berber, in Kef

Berber languages
Languages of Algeria
Riff languages